The 1970 United States Senate special election in Alaska was held on November 3, 1970. Republican U.S. Senator Ted Stevens was appointed on December 24, 1968, following the death of Bob Bartlett in the middle of his second term. Stevens won the special election for the right to serve the remainder of Bartlett's term, which expired on January 3, 1973. After completing his term, Stevens would go on to serve 6 more full terms until his defeat in 2008.

Primary election

Candidates

Republican 
 Fritz Singer
 Ted Stevens, incumbent U.S. Senator since 1968, former Solicitor of the Interior

Democratic 
 Joe Josephson, state senator
 Wendell P. Kay, Speaker of the Alaska House of Representatives

Results

General election

Results overview

Results by district

See also 
 1970 United States Senate elections
 List of special elections to the United States Senate

References 

Alaska 1970
Alaska 1970
1970 Special
Alaska Special
United States Senate Special
United States Senate 1970